Jennifer Rodriguez (born June 8, 1976) is a Cuban-American speed skater. She started her career as an artistic roller skater, winning multiple national championships and placing second and third at world championships. Later she switched to inline speed skating and became world champion in 1993. Her inline speed coach was Bob Manning.

In 1996 she made another career move by giving it a try on ice, in order to have a chance to make the Olympic team. This was a success, and she participated in the 1998, 2002, 2006 and 2010 Winter Olympics, winning two bronze medals in Salt Lake City in 2002. She is also known by the nicknames Miami Ice and J-Rod.

She was previously married to American speed skater K. C. Boutiette, who was the first to switch from inline speed skating to ice skating and motivated Rodriguez to do the same.

See also
 List of Cuban Americans

References

 Jen Rodriguez's U.S. Olympic Team bio ... with features and photos
 ISU profile
 US Speedskating profile

External links
 
 "The Concierge Questionnaire-Jennifer Rodriguez Interview"

1976 births
American female speed skaters
Speed skaters at the 1998 Winter Olympics
Speed skaters at the 2002 Winter Olympics
Speed skaters at the 2006 Winter Olympics
Speed skaters at the 2010 Winter Olympics
Medalists at the 2002 Winter Olympics
Olympic bronze medalists for the United States in speed skating
Sportspeople from Miami
Living people
21st-century American women